Sharpe's Trafalgar is the fourth historical novel in the Richard Sharpe series by Bernard Cornwell, first published in 2000. It is the first of the novels in the wars against Napoleon, putting the army ensign at the Battle of Trafalgar in 1805.

Plot summary

In 1805, Richard Sharpe is to sail to England from India aboard the East Indiaman Calliope to join the 95th Rifles. He is swindled after purchasing supplies for the voyage. After finding out, he gets not only his money back, but also helps fellow victim Royal Navy Captain Joel Chase do the same, saving Chase from great financial embarrassment. Chase wants to show his gratitude, but is under orders to destroy a French 74 named the Revenant that is raiding the Indian Ocean.

The Calliopes passengers include the lovely, young Lady Grace Hale and her much older husband, Lord William Hale. Sharpe is also astonished to find aboard Anthony Pohlmann, a renegade and former Maratha warlord (defeated by Arthur Wellesley in Sharpe's Triumph), traveling under a false identity – Baron von Dornberg – but sees no reason to denounce his former foe.

Peculiar Cromwell, captain of the Calliope, spots the jewels (looted from an Indian ruler) Sharpe has sewn into his clothing and insists that Sharpe leave them with him for safekeeping, to avoid tempting his crew.

Sharpe becomes obsessed with Lady Grace, but his attempts to become better acquainted are unsuccessful, at first. However, she later questions him in private about "Dornberg"; while Cromwell and Dornberg denied knowing each other, she has observed them conversing frequently. Sharpe protects Dornberg as best he can. When Lady Grace gets up to leave, a sudden movement of the ship causes her to stumble, and Sharpe ends up with his arm around her waist. They eventually become secret lovers.

Cromwell leaves the safety of a slow convoy with his fast ship. Lady Grace becomes worried that they are sailing near French-held Mauritius. She ends up spending the first of several nights with Sharpe. Malachi Braithwaite, Lord Hale's secretary, finds out and is angered, as he is attracted to Lady Grace too. Sharpe threatens to kill him if he tells anyone.

The Revenant appears. Before the Calliope is captured, Sharpe hurries to retrieve his jewels from Cromwell's safe, but they are not there. Sharpe suspects both Cromwell and Pohlmann aided the French; both men board the Revenant. A prize crew starts sailing the Calliope to Mauritius. Later, the lieutenant in charge tries to rape Lady Grace; Sharpe goes to her rescue and kills the Frenchman in a swordfight. The French understand and do not punish Sharpe. One day, another ship is spotted. Sharpe manages to cut the tiller ropes controlling the rudder, slowing the Calliope. This enables Captain Chase's Pucelle to capture the Calliope.

Chase invites Sharpe to transfer to his ship; Sharpe is reluctant to accept, until he discovers that Lord Hale has insisted on switching to the faster Pucelle, along with his wife. Chase confides to Sharpe that a French agent, probably Dornberg's "servant", negotiated a secret treaty with the ablest of the Indian Maratha leaders. If it is delivered to Paris, the French might send arms to the Marathas to start a new war against the British.

Chase does everything in his power to overtake the Revenant. Sharpe trains with the Marines for shipboard fighting and is introduced to a seven-barreled Nock gun (a weapon which future friend Patrick Harper will favour). A ship is spotted. The Pucelle gives chase, but loses it.

Meanwhile, Lady Grace tells Sharpe that Braithwaite is trying to blackmail her. He ambushes the man. Braithwaite produces a pistol and tries to negotiate, claiming he left a letter describing Sharpe's affair, but Sharpe kills him. When the corpse is found, people assume Braithwaite had a fatal fall.

The Revenant is spotted, and a long chase commences. One night, Lady Grace hesitantly informs Sharpe that she is pregnant with his child, unsure of his reaction. He is delighted.

Just when it seems that the Revenant will get away, the combined French and Spanish fleets sortie, with Admiral Horatio Nelson's fleet in pursuit. The Revenant joins the enemy fleet, while the Pucelle comes under Nelson's command. When Nelson summons Chase to a meeting, Chase brings Sharpe along and introduces him to his friend the admiral.

When the British attack the enemy fleet, commencing the Battle of Trafalgar, Chase points out the Revenant to Sharpe. Chase sends the Hales to safety, over Lord Hale's protest, while Sharpe joins the Marines. The Pucelle and the Revenant pound each other. The Revenant is captured. Pohlmann is killed by a cannonball. Sharpe finds the French agent and tosses him into the sea; the man cannot swim. Cromwell survives; Sharpe retrieves his jewels before reluctantly handing him over to Chase.

When Sharpe goes to find Lady Grace, he discovers that she has killed her husband. While the battle was raging, Lord Hale had confronted his wife over Braithwaite's letter. He eventually told her that he would kill her and make it appear a suicide. He also promised to sabotage Sharpe's life secretly. Sharpe sees to it his body is taken up on deck so it will seem that he was killed in the fighting. Upset at first, Lady Grace realises she is now free to do as she pleases.

Characters in Sharpe's Trafalgar
 Richard Sharpe
 Lady Grace Hale, wife of Lord Hale
 Lord William Hale, British diplomat
 Horatio Nelson, admiral of the British fleet
 The "Baron von Dornberg", actually Anthony Pohlmann
 Malachi Braithwaite, Lord Hale's secretary
 Joel Chase, captain of the Pucelle
 Peculiar Cromwell, captain of the Calliope
 Louis Montmorin, captain of the Revenant
 Clouter, gun captain of one of the' 32-pounder carronades

Real people who were at both battles
In his historical note, Cornwell comments that, aside from Sharpe, a fictional character, he is aware of only one person who was present at both Trafalgar and Waterloo: Miguel de Álava, originally a marine in the Spanish Navy at the time when Spain was allied with France, later a general and close personal friend of the Duke of Wellington, and Spanish ambassador to the Netherlands.
In his later nonfiction work, Waterloo: The History of Four Days, Three Armies, and Three Battles, Cornwell amends this statement by adding that at least one unit of Napoleon's Army of the North that fought at Waterloo was formed from former French marines who had served at Trafalgar.
General Antoine Drouot is also supposed to have been at both battles.

Release details
2000, UK, HarperCollins , published 3 April 2000, hardcover (first edition)
2000, UK, HarperCollins , published 6 November 2000, paperback
2000, UK, HarperCollins , published 3 April 2000, audio book (cassette)
2000, UK, Chivers Audio Books , published December 2000?, audio book (CD)

External links
Section from Bernard Cornwell's website on Sharpe's Trafalgar

2000 British novels
Trafalgar
Fiction set in 1805
HarperCollins books
Battle of Trafalgar